Thornlie Station is a railway station on the Transperth network. It is the terminus of the Thornlie spur of the Armadale Line,  from Perth Station serving the suburb of Thornlie, Western Australia. Under construction is the Thornlie-Cockburn Link which will link to Cockburn Central railway station along the Mandurah line via two new stations, Nicholson Road railway station and Ranford Road railway station.

History
In December 1999, legislation was tabled by the Government of Western Australia to build the Southern Suburbs Railway from a junction with the Armadale line east of Beckenham Station passing beneath Albany Highway, Roe Highway and the Kwinana freight line via the Kewdale Tunnel, then paralleling the freight line south to Jandakot before continuing via the median strip of the Kwinana Freeway.

However, in 2002, following a change in government, the Southern Suburbs Railway was altered to operate via a more direct route to Perth. By this stage the first part of the Kenwick Tunnel had been built.

To justify the completion of Kenwick Tunnel and other infrastructure, the route was converted into a short spur line to Thornlie.

The spur and Thornlie station opened on 7 August 2005.

Thornlie–Cockburn link
Thornlie station will be modified for the extension of the Thornlie line to Cockburn Central station on the Mandurah line. The station will remain in use during these works. The extension to Cockburn Central is planned to open late 2024.

Services
Thornlie station is served by Transperth Thornlie Line services.

The station saw 578,199 passengers in the 2013-14 financial year.

Platforms

Bus routes

References

External links

Gallery History of Western Australian Railways & Stations

Armadale and Thornlie lines
Railway stations in Perth, Western Australia
Railway stations in Australia opened in 2005